Meissen (in German orthography: Meißen) is a town of approximately 30,000 about  northwest of Dresden on both banks of the Elbe river in the Free State of Saxony, in eastern Germany. Meissen is the home of Meissen porcelain, the Albrechtsburg castle, the Gothic Meissen Cathedral and the Meissen Frauenkirche. The Große Kreisstadt is the capital of the Meissen district.

Names

 
 , ou, selon l'orthographe allemande: Meißen; en français suranné: Misnie
 
 
 
 
 
 

History

Meissen is sometimes known as the "cradle of Saxony". It grew out of the early West Slavic settlement of Misni inhabited by Glomatians and was founded as a German town by King Henry the Fowler in 929. In 968, the Diocese of Meissen was founded, and Meissen became the episcopal see of a bishop. The Catholic bishopric was suppressed in 1581 after the diocese accepted the Protestant Reformation (1559), but re-created in 1921 with its seat first at Bautzen and now at the Katholische Hofkirche in Dresden.

In 965, the Margraviate of Meissen, a frontier march of the Holy Roman Empire, was founded, with Meissen as its capital. A market town by 1000, Meissen passed to the Duchy of Poland in 1002 under Boleslaw I the Brave, afterwards into hands of Henry II a few months later and to the House of Wettin in 1089. In 1015, Meissen was besieged by the Poles led by future King Mieszko II.

In 1241, the town was attacked in the Mongol raid on Meissen. The small Mongol force under Orda Khan defeated Meissens's defenders and much of the town was destroyed. The Mongols withdrew from Germany after the death of Ögedei Khan, sparing the region from further destruction.

The town was at the forefront of the Ostsiedlung, or intensive German settlement of the rural Slavic lands east of the Elbe, and its reception of town rights dates to 1332.

The construction of Meissen Cathedral was begun in 1260 on the same hill as the Albrechtsburg castle. The resulting lack of space led to the cathedral being one of the smallest cathedrals in Europe. The church is also known as being one of the purest examples of Gothic architecture.

In 1423, Meissen became capital of the Electorate of Saxony. In 1464, the capital was moved to Dresden.

In 1759, the Austrians defeated the Prussians at the Battle of Meissen.

During World War II, a subcamp of Flossenbürg concentration camp was located in Meissen.

Meissen served as an important place of religious dialogue in 1988 when the agreement on mutual recognition between the German Evangelical Church (both East and West German) and the Church of England was signed in the town in 1988.

Porcelain

Meissen is famous for the manufacture of porcelain, based on extensive local deposits of china clay (kaolin) and potter's clay (potter's earth). Meissen porcelain was the first high-quality porcelain to be produced outside of the Orient.

The first European porcelain was manufactured in Meissen in 1710, when by decree of King Augustus II the Strong the Royal-Polish and Electoral-Saxon Porcelain Factory (Königlich-Polnische und Kurfürstlich-Sächsische Porzellan-Manufaktur) was opened in the Albrechtsburg. In 1861, it was moved to the Triebisch river valley of Meissen, where the porcelain factory can still be found today. Along with porcelain, other ceramics are also manufactured in the town. In the old town streets, there have been set up numerous porcelain stores, often selling antique Meissen porcelain and sometimes offering repair of broken porcelain. In Meissen and the surrounding area, several former painters from the manufacturer have set up porcelain painting workshops and galleries with their own pieces of porcelain art.

Main sights

The Albrechtsburg, the former residence of the House of Wettin, is regarded as being the first castle to be used as a royal residence in the German-speaking world. Built between 1472 and 1525, it is a fine example of late Gothic style. It was redecorated in the 19th century with a range of murals depicting Saxon history. Today the castle is a museum. Nearby is the 13th-century Gothic Meissen Cathedral (Meißner Dom), whose chapel is one of the most famous burial places of the Wettin family.  The hill on which the castle and the cathedral are built offers a view over the roofs of the old town.

Meissen's historical district is located mostly around the market at the foot of the castle hill. It contains many buildings of Renaissance architecture. Also imposing is the view from the 57-metre-high tower of the Frauenkirche (Church of Our Lady), situated in the old market-place. This church, not to be confused with the Dresden Frauenkirche, was first mentioned in a 1205 deed issued by Bishop Dietrich II and after a blaze about 1450 rebuilt in the Late Gothic style of a hall church. Its tower hosts the world's first porcelain carillon, manufactured in 1929 on the occasion of the town's 1000-years-jubilee. Another popular tourist sight is the world-famous Meissen porcelain factory.

From spring to autumn, several festivals take place in Meissen, such as the pottery market or the Weinfest, which celebrates the wine harvest. Meissen wine is produced at the vineyards in the river valley (Elbtal) around the town, part of the Saxonian wine region, one of the northernmost in Europe.

Educational institutions
Meissen is the home of the Saxon public elite college Sächsisches Landesgymnasium Sankt Afra zu Meißen.

Also the Saxon Civil Servants Academy and the Academy of the Evangelical Church of Saxony are located in the town.

Notable people

Saint Benno (c. 1010–1106), Bishop of Meissen
Adam of Bremen (before 1050 – 1081/1085), medieval chronicler
Heinrich Frauenlob (1250/60–1318), poet
Anna of Saxony, Landgravine of Hesse (1420–1462)
Heinrich von Sachsen (1422–1435), Margrave of Meissen and Duke of Saxony
Johann Klaj (1616–1656), poet
Johann Elias Schlegel (1719–1749), critic and poet
Johann Adolf Schlegel (1721–1793), poet and clergyman
Samuel Hahnemann (1755–1843), physician and founder of Homoeopathy
Louise Otto-Peters (1819–1895), suffragist and women's rights movement activist
Karl G. Maeser (1828–1901), Mormon academic
Erich Naumann (1905–1951), Nazi SS-Brigadeführer and Einsatzgruppe commander, executed for war crimes
Hans Philipp (1917–1943), combat pilot
Peter Schreier (1935–2019), opera singer and conductor
Ralf Schumann (born 1962), shooter, Olympic winner
Stefan Schuster (born 1961), biophysicist and bioinformatician
Jörg Urban (born 1964), politician (AfD)
Stephan Matthias Lademann, classical pianist

Worked in the town
Kaspar Eberhard (1523–1575), superintendent of Meissen 1564–1574
Johann Friedrich Böttger (1682–1719), co-inventor of the European porcelain
Johann Gregor Herold (1696–1775), porcelain painter and superintendent of the factory
Johann Joachim Kändler (1706–1775), porcelain modeller
Gotthold Ephraim Lessing (1729–1781), writer, pupil of the Sächsisches Landesgymnasium
Willy Ascherl (1902–1929), footballer
Erich Schmidt (1910–2005), church musician, in 1950–1980 Domkantor in Meissen
Hans-Ulrich Thomale (born 1944), football player and manager
Matthias Müller (born 1954), football player and manager

Twin towns – sister cities

Meissen is twinned with:

 Vitry-sur-Seine, France (1973)
 Arita, Japan (1979)
 Fellbach, Germany (1987)
 Litoměřice, Czech Republic (1996)
 Corfu, Greece (1996)
 Provo, United States (2001)
 Legnica, Poland (2017)

See also
List of margraves of Meissen
Proschwitz
Rulers of Saxony
Saxon Switzerland
Meissen groschen

Citations

Bibliography

External links

Official website 
GCatholic.org
Further information on Tourism 

 
Towns in Saxony
Wine regions of Germany
Meissen (district)
Populated riverside places in Germany
Populated places on the Elbe